The Hand of the Devil is a 2006 fantasy horror novel written by Dean Vincent Carter. It is centred on a young man named Ashley Reeves, a journalist for a science magazine Missing Link. He receives a letter from a Reginald G. Mather to see the only example of the Ganges Red mosquito on his island in the Lake District. Agreeing to his terms, Ashley travels to the island alone, and becomes stranded, and what was once a good story quickly transforms into a macabre nightmare.

Characters
Ashley Reeves -Ashley is the protagonist  throughout the story. He is in love with Gina.

Dr. Reginald Mathers - Mathers sent a letter to Ashley Reeves inviting him to his house. He, somehow, came into possession of the Red Ganges mosquito to study it.

Dr. Alexander Soames: He and Dr Mathers studied medicine together.

Gina -  Gina works at the same magazine as Ashley.

2006 British novels
British horror novels
Novels set in the Lake District
The Bodley Head books